Timur Arsenovich Valiev (born January 19, 1990) is a Russian mixed martial artist who competes in the bantamweight division. Valiev previously fought in the Ultimate Fighting Championship (UFC) and Professional Fighters League (PFL).

Background

Timur Valiev was born on January 19, 1990, in Makhachkala, Dagestan, Russia. In the high school he competed in soccer, then at the age of sixteen on the advice of a friend he joined to Wushu Sanda. Also he trained kickboxing and thai boxing. He won a gold medal in European Pankration Championship and 3rd in World Cup.

Mixed martial arts career

Early career

Valiev made his professional MMA debut on September 4, 2010, in Portugal at the World Ultimate Full Contact 16 against Olle Raberg of Sweden. He lost the fight via unanimous decision.

Eurasia Fight Nights Global
Valiev faced UFC hopeful Oleg Borisov on November 3, 2012, at the EFN - Battle of Moscow 8. He won the  fight via unanimous decision.

World Series of Fighting
His WSOF debut was at the WSOF 10 on June 14, 2014, against Adam Acquaviva. He won the fight via technical knockout in the third round.

Valiev faced Isaiah Chapman at the WSOF 13 on September 13, 2014. He won thefight via unanimous decision.

Valiev faced Ed West at the WSOF 19 on March 28, 2015. He won the fight via technical knockout in the first round.

Valiev faced Tito Jones at the WSOF 23 on September 28, 2015. He won the fight via unanimous decision.

Valiev faced Chris Gutiérrez at the WSOF 28 on February 20, 2016. He lost the back-and-forth fight by split decision. After the fight WSOF president Ray Sefo did not agree with the result fight and gave a rematch for Valiev.

In their second fight, Valiev defeated Chris Gutiérrez at WSOF 33 on October 7, 2016, via unanimous decision.

Valiev was expected to face Bekbulat Magomedov on March 18, 2017, at WSOF 35 for vacant Bantamweight title. However, Valiev pulled out of the fight in the beginning of March citing an elbow injury and was replaced by Donavon Frelow.

Professional Fighters League
Valiev faced Josenaldo Silva on November 2, 2017, at PFL: Fight Night. He won the fight via submission in the third round.

Valiev faced Max Coga on June 7, 2018, at PFL 1. He won the fight by unanimous decision.

Originally a fight between Timur Valiev vs. Lee Coville was set, however due to undisclosed reasons Coville was forced to pull out, and was replaced by countrymen Bekbulat Magomedov on July 19, 2018, at PFL 4. He won the bout via unanimous decision.

Ultimate Fighting Championship
Valiev was scheduled to make his promotional debut against Jamall Emmers in a featherweight bout on August 1, 2020, at UFC Fight Night: Brunson vs. Shahbazyan. However, Valiev was removed from the card two days before the event for undisclosed reasons and replaced by Vincent Cachero.

Valiev was quickly rescheduled and expected to face fellow newcomer Mark Striegl on August 22, 2020, at UFC on ESPN 15. In turn, Striegl was removed from the fight on August 20 after testing positive for COVID-19 and replaced by Trevin Jones. Valiev lost the fight via TKO in the second round. On October 7, it was announced that the Nevada State Athletic Commission (NSAC) issued a four and a half month suspension for Trevin Jones, after he tested positive for marijuana in a drug test related to his fight. They also announced that Jones' victory was overturned to a no contest due to the violation. He was fined $1,800 and before he is relicensed in Las Vegas, Jones will also have to pay a prosecution fee of $145.36.

Valiev was expected to face Julio Arce on February 6, 2021, at UFC Fight Night 184. However, Arce was removed from the event in late January due to undisclosed reasons and replaced by Martin Day. He won the fight via unanimous decision.

Valiev faced Raoni Barcelos on June 26, 2021, at UFC Fight Night: Gane vs. Volkov. Despite being knocked down twice in the second round, Valiev won the fight via majority decision. This fight earned him the Fight of the Night award.

Valiev faced Jack Shore, replacing Umar Nurmagomedov, on March 19, 2022, at UFC Fight Night 204. He lost the fight via unanimous decision.

On June 23, 2022, it was announced that Valiev was no longer on the UFC roster.

Championships and accomplishments

Mixed martial arts
Ultimate Fighting Championship
Fight of the Night (One time)

Pankration
International Pankration federation 
World Champion.
European Champion.
World Cup - 3rd.

Grappling
Russian Grappling Federation
Russian Open winner.

Kudo
Russian Kudo Federation
Dagestan Championship - winner.

Hand-to-hand combat
Russian HTH Federation
Dagestan Open - winner.

Mixed martial arts record

|-
|Loss
|align=center|18–3 (1)
|Jack Shore
|Decision (unanimous)
|UFC Fight Night: Volkov vs. Aspinall
|
|align=center|3
|align=center|5:00
|London, England
|
|-
|Win
|align=center|18–2 (1)
|Raoni Barcelos
|Decision (majority)
|UFC Fight Night: Gane vs. Volkov
|
|align=center|3
|align=center|5:00
|Las Vegas, Nevada, United States
|
|-
|Win
|align=center|17–2 (1)
|Martin Day
|Decision (unanimous)
|UFC Fight Night: Overeem vs. Volkov
|
|align=center|3
|align=center|5:00
|Las Vegas, Nevada, United States
|
|-
|NC
|align=center|16–2 (1)
|Trevin Jones
|NC (overturned)
|UFC on ESPN: Munhoz vs. Edgar 
|
|align=center|2
|align=center|1:59
|Las Vegas, Nevada, United States
|
|-
|Win
|align=center|16–2
|Taigro Costa
|Decision (unanimous)
|Gorilla Fighting 22
|
|align=center|3
|align=center|5:00
|Krasnodar, Russia
|
|-
|Win
|align=center|15–2
|Giovanni da Silva Santos Jr.
|TKO (punches)
|Gorilla Fighting 14
|
|align=center|1
|align=center|3:58
|Kaspiysk, Russia
|
|-
|Win
|align=center|14–2
|Bekbulat Magomedov
|Decision (unanimous)
|PFL 4
|
| align=center|3
| align=center|5:00
|Uniondale, New York, United States 
|
|-
|Win
|align=center|13–2
|Max Coga
| Decision (unanimous)
|PFL 1
|
| align=center| 3
| align=center| 5:00
|New York City, New York, United States 
| 
|-
| Win
| align=center| 12–2
| Josenaldo Silva
| Submission (rear-naked choke)
| PFL: Fight Night
| 
| align=center| 3
| align=center| 2:12
| Washington, D.C., United States
|
|-
| Win
| align=center| 11–2
| Chris Gutiérrez
| Decision (unanimous)
| WSOF 33
| 
| align=center| 3
| align=center| 5:00
| Kansas City, Missouri, United States
|
|-
| Loss
| align=center| 10–2
| Chris Gutiérrez
| Decision (split)
| WSOF 28
| 
| align=center| 3
| align=center| 5:00
| Garden Grove, California, United States
|
|-
| Win
| align=center| 10–1
| Tito Jones
| Decision (unanimous)
| WSOF 23
| 
| align=center| 3
| align=center| 5:00
| Phoenix, Arizona, United States
|
|-
| Win
| align=center| 9–1
| Ed West
| TKO (elbows and punches)
| WSOF 19
| 
| align=center| 1
| align=center| 1:39
| Phoenix, Arizona, United States
|
|-
| Win
| align=center| 8–1
| Isaiah Chapman
| Decision (unanimous)
| WSOF 13
| 
| align=center| 3
| align=center| 5:00
| Bethlehem, Pennsylvania, United States
|
|-
| Win
| align=center| 7–1
| Adam Acquaviva
| TKO (flying knee)
| WSOF 10
| 
| align=center| 3
| align=center| 1:35
| Las Vegas, Nevada, United States
|
|-
|Win
| align=center| 6–1
| Bruno Marques
| Decision (unanimous)
| Battle of Stars 2
| 
| align=center| 3
| align=center| 5:00
| Makhachkala, Russia
|
|-
|Win
| align=center| 5–1
| Oleg Borisov
| Decision (unanimous)
| Fight Nights Global: Battle of Moscow 8
| 
| align=center| 3
| align=center| 5:00
| Moscow, Russia
|
|-
|Win
| align=center| 4–1
| Algiz Vakhitov
| TKO (punches)
| Colosseum Battles Champions
| 
| align=center| 1
| align=center| 1:34
| Ufa, Russia
|
|-
| Win
| align=center| 3–1
| Evgeniy Lazukov
| TKO (punches)
| Dictator Fighting Championship 1
| 
| align=center| 1
| align=center| 4:36
| Moscow, Russia
|
|-
| Win
| align=center| 2–1
| Fernando Cosenday
| Decision (unanimous)
| Top Fight: Battle of the Gyms
| 
| align=center| 2
| align=center| 5:00
| Dubai, United Arab Emirates
|
|-
| Win
| align=center| 1–1
| Gadzhimurad Gasanov
| Submission (armbar)
| Urkarakh Fights
| 
| align=center| 1
| align=center| 4:28
| Urkarakh, Russia
|
|-
| Loss
| align=center| 0–1
| Olle Raberg
| Decision (unanimous)
| World Ultimate Full Contact 16
| 
| align=center| 1
| align=center| 10:00
| Viseu, Portugal
|

See also
 List of male mixed martial artists

References

External links
Official WSOF Profile

1990 births
Living people
Dagestani mixed martial artists
Sportspeople from Makhachkala
Russian expatriates in the United States
Russian male mixed martial artists
Russian sambo practitioners
Russian sanshou practitioners
Russian Muay Thai practitioners
Russian practitioners of Brazilian jiu-jitsu
Bantamweight mixed martial artists
Laks (Caucasus)
Ultimate Fighting Championship male fighters
Mixed martial artists utilizing sambo
Mixed martial artists utilizing pankration
Mixed martial artists utilizing sanshou
Mixed martial artists utilizing Muay Thai
Mixed martial artists utilizing kūdō
Mixed martial artists utilizing Brazilian jiu-jitsu